Telangana, India has one commercial airport which has access to international flights along with some non-used airstrips for emergency purposes.

Rajiv Gandhi International Airport under the governance of Airport Authority of India is the only airport in state of Telangana with connections to domestic and international destinations.

List 
The list includes the domestic, military and non-operational airports with their respective ICAO and IATA codes.

Source: Airports Authority of India

References

T
Airports in Telangana
Airports